FC Lokomotiv Moscow (FC Lokomotiv Moskva) is a Russian professional football club based in Moscow. Lokomotiv have won the Russian Premier League on three occasions; the Soviet Cup twice; and the Russian Cup a record nine times. After the 2022 Russian invasion of Ukraine, the European Club Association suspended the team.

History

Early years
Lokomotiv was founded as Kazanka (Moskovsko-Kazanskaya Zh.D) in 1922. In 1924, the club brought together the strongest football players of several lines of the Moscow railway system as KOR ("Club of the October Revolution"). In 1931, the club was again renamed to Kazanka (Moskovskaya-Kazanskaya Zh.D) and in 1936, it was eventually renamed to as it is known today, Lokomotiv (the name means "Locomotive"). During the Communist rule, Lokomotiv Moscow club was a part of the Lokomotiv Voluntary Sports Society and was owned by the Soviet Ministry of Transportation through the Russian Railways.

Soviet era

When the Lokomotiv Voluntary Sports Society was created in 1936, its football team featured the best players of Kazanka, and a number of strong Soviet footballers of that time such as Valentin Granatkin, Nikolay llyin, Alexey Sokolov, Pyotr Terenkov, Mikhail Zhukov, llya Gvozdkov and Ivan Andreev. Lokomotiv debuted in the first-ever Soviet football club championship with a game against Dynamo Leningrad on 22 May 1936. In the first two seasonal championships (spring and autumn), Lokomotiv finished fifth and fourth respectively. The first Lokomotiv success arrived shortly as in 1936, the railwaymen rose up to the occasion to beat Dynamo Tbilisi 2–0 in the Soviet Cup Final, thus winning the first Soviet Cup.

The following years were rather successful as Lokomotiv were consistent in the national championships. However, performances after World War II suffered and in a five-year span, Lokomotiv were relegated to the Soviet First League twice. In 1951, Lokomotiv came second and eventually won the promotion to the Soviet Top League. This kicked off the second Lokomotiv's resurgence and until the beginning of the 1960s, Lokomotiv competed for the USSR's top trophies. In 1957, Lokomotiv won the cup for the second time, and two years later, Lokomotiv won the silver medals of the Soviet League. Second place was the highest position ever obtained by Lokomotiv during the Soviet era.

Another important trademark for Lokomotiv was the authorization of playing friendly matches against foreign opposition. Typically, up to the late 1950s, international sports contacts with Soviet teams were extremely rare. However, since in 1955, Lokomotiv became a quasi-"football ambassador" for the Soviet Union abroad, participating in friendly matches in various parts of the world, including Europe, Asia, Africa and even North America. This policy of openness ushered in a great era for Lokomotiv, with the squad including some of the finest Soviet footballers of the era, such as Vladimir Maslachenko, Gennady Zabelin, Eugeny Rogov, Valentin Bubukin, Victor Sokolov, Victor Voroshilov, Igor Zajtsev, Zaur Kaloyev, Yuri Kovalyov and Vitaly Artemyev. When Lokomotiv's strongest players abandoned the club, however, Lokomotiv fell again from grace and a swing between the first and second divisions followed, instability lasting until the end of the 1980s.

Post-Soviet era
In the beginning of the 1990s, Lokomotiv was considered the "weakest link" amongst the top Moscow clubs. It lacked both results on the pitch and fans' support in the stands. In 2002, a new stadium—Lokomotiv Stadium—resembling a traditional, compact English one was built.

In 2002, a "golden match" was needed to decide who will be the champion, as Lokomotiv Moscow and CSKA Moscow both finished with the same number of points after Gameweek 30. The game was played at Dynamo Stadium in front of a sold-out crowd. Lokomotiv took an early lead thanks a low drive from captain Dmitry Loskov, and eventually the goal turned out to be enough for Lokomotiv to claim the first title in the club's history.

Two years later, Lokomotiv again won the Russian Premier League, edging city rivals CSKA by a single point; Lokomotiv defeated Shinnik Yaroslavl 0–2 in Yaroslavl, a week after CSKA fell to city rivals Dynamo at home.

In 2005, long-time head coach Yuri Semin left the team to coach the Russian national team, where he was replaced at Lokomotiv by Vladimir Eshtrekov. During the same year, although leading the league for most of the year, Lokomotiv stumbled in the last games of the campaign, allowing CSKA overtake them and claim the title, with Lokomotiv ultimately falling to third. Estrekhov was later sacked and replaced by Slavoljub Muslin, the first foreign manager in the club's history. After a poor start to the new season, Lokomotiv recovered and finished third, but despite the respectable performance, Muslin was sacked; Anatoly Byshovets took the helm as his replacement, with Yury Semin returning to serve as team president. This brought little success to Lokomotiv, who finished the season in seventh, with the only bright spot being the victory of the Russian Cup. These poor performances prompted the board of directors to sack both coach Anatoly Byshovets and President Semin. Rinat Bilyaletdinov was subsequently named caretaker coach. This lasted until 6 December 2006, when Lokomotiv brought in Rashid Rakhimov from Amkar Perm on a three-year contract. Again, however, this resulted to be yet another poor decision from the board, as Lokomotiv only finished seventh in 2008, also beginning the 2009 season poorly. Unsurprisingly, on 28 April 2009, Lokomotiv fired Rakhimov; long-serving player Vladimir Maminov was installed as a caretaker manager. A month later, Semin was brought back to the club to take charge. After a really poor start, Lokomotiv recovered and finished the season on a high, claiming fourth place in the process.

In 2010 shortly after the signing of former Lokomotiv player Peter Odemwingie to West Bromwich Albion, photographs showed Lokomotiv Moscow fans celebrating the sale of Odemwingie through the use of racist banners targeted at the player. One banner included the image of a banana and read "Thanks West Brom". Before West Brom's game against Tottenham Hotspur in September 2010, it was announced that West Brom fans would unfurl a banner to counter the racist one, the banner read 'Thanks Lokomotiv' and is accompanied by a picture of Odemwingie celebrating his win on his debut against Sunderland.

Before the 2011–12 league season, Semin left the club and was replaced by former Spartak Nalchuk manager Yuri Krasnozhan. On 4 June 2011, rumours spread that Lokomotiv chairman Olga Smorodskaya suspected Krasnozhan of throwing away the 27 May, 1–2 home league defeat to Anzhi Makhachkala, deciding to sack him on the grounds of the suspicion. Lokomotiv was fifth in the table at the time, just one point away from first-placed CSKA. On 6 July, after a Lokomotiv Committee of Directors meeting, Krasnozhan's contract was officially terminated on the basis of "negligence in his job." The Russian Football Union subsequently refused to investigate the case. Assistant manager Maminov again took over as caretaker for three weeks until a replacement was found in the form of José Couceiro, who had himself just finished a caretaking stint as manager of Sporting Clube de Portugal.

Couceiro, however, lasted just one year in the role, as the club opted not to renew his contract at the end of the 2011–12 season. After Croatian national team head coach Slaven Bilić announced he would step down after his nation's participation at Euro 2012, Loko acted quickly to sign him to a three-year contract. However, Bilić's first season at the helm brought another disappointment, as Loko finished ninth, its lowest-ever finish in the post-Soviet era of Russian domestic football. Just prior to the 2013–14 season, Bilić was sacked and replaced with new head coach Leonid Kuchuk. Eventually, however, Lokomotiv ran out of steam and after only managing to win a single points from the last three matches of the season, Lokomotiv had to settle for the third place.

Recent history 

In the following season, Kuchuk failed to build up on the improved performances of the previous season and with Lokomotiv languished at the ninth place, Kuchuk was given the sack prematurely. Miodrag Božović was called to steady the ship but despite the early promise, a disastrous run of one win in a stretch of nine matches resulted in Božović being sacked with three league matches to go and with Igor Cherevchenko re-appointed as caretaker manager for the second time during the season. Despite the poor league performance, wherein Lokomotiv placed in the 7th place again, Lokomotiv did end the season on a positive tone as Cherevchenko managed to rally his troops and win the Russian Cup with a 3–1 win over Kuban Krasnodar. This success, which brought the first piece of silverware to Lokomotiv in 8 years, was enough to convince Olga Smorodskaya to appoint Cherevchenko on a permanent basis. Lokomotiv's performances under Cherechenko did improve in the beginning but it was a false promise once again as in the end Lokomotiv faltered and did not manage to qualify for European football. Notwithstanding this, Cherevchenko was confirmed for the 2016–17 season.

After months of speculation, and with only two games in the new season, the board pulled the plug on Smorodskaya's disastrous tenure and relieved Smorodskaya hand Cherechenko from their positions. Ilya Herkus was brought in for Smorodskaya and with the goal of resolving the previous board's fractious relationship with the fans and bring them back to the stadium, Lokomotiv appointed Yury Semin as their manager for the fourth time. In also came crowd favourite Dmitri Loskov, who was assigned to assist Semin with his duties. Despite the good feelings brought by the change in management, Lokomotiv's performances seldom improved and a tumultuous season ended up in Lokomotiv placing in a disappointing eighth position. In what was the only highlight of the season, Lokomotiv managed to snatch the Russian Cup for a joint record seventh time by crushing Ural Yekaterinburg's dreams of their first ever piece of silverware with a two-nil victory.

Despite the average league performance, Semin was confirmed for the next season. Herkus' decision to retain Semin resulted to be a shrewd decision as Semin managed to do the unthinkable and rallied Lokomotiv to win the Russian Premier League for only the third time in their history. In Europe, Lokomotiv also performed admirably, as they managed to advance to Round of 16 for the first time in their history and got eliminated by Atlético Madrid, who eventually went on to win the Cup.

After the 2022 Russian invasion of Ukraine, the European Club Association suspended the team.

Performances in Europe

Lokomotiv reached the Cup Winners' Cup semi-final twice, in 1997–98 and 1998–99. The club also played in the UEFA Champions League for the 2002–03 and 2003–04 seasons, progressing past the group stage in the latter only to fall to eventual finalists AS Monaco in the round of 16. They qualified to the group stages again for the 2019–20 season.

Players

Current squad

Out on loan

League positions

Honours

Domestic competitions

Leagues
Soviet Top League / Russian Premier League
Winners (3): 2002, 2004, 2017–18
Runners-up (7): 1959, 1995, 1999, 2000, 2001, 2018–19, 2019–20
Soviet First League / Russian National Football League
Winners (3): 1947, 1964, 1974
Runners-up (2): 1971, 1987

Cups
Soviet Cup / Russian Cup
Winners (11): 1936, 1957, 1995–96, 1996–97, 1999–2000, 2000–01, 2006–07, 2014–15, 2016–17, 2018–19, 2020–21
Runners-up (2): 1989–90, 1997–98
Soviet Super Cup / Russian Super Cup
Winners (3): 2003, 2005, 2019
Runners-up (6): 2008, 2015, 2017, 2018, 2020, 2021

International competitions
UEFA Cup Winners' Cup
Semi-finalists (2): 1997–98, 1998–99
 Commonwealth of Independent States Cup
Winners: 2005

Stadium

Lokomotiv play their home games at RZD Arena. Its total seating capacity is 27,320 seats, all covered. The stadium was opened after reconstruction in 2002.

Ownerships, kit suppliers, and Sponsors

League and Cup history

Soviet Union

Russia

{|class="wikitable"
|- style="background:#efefef;"
! Season
! Div.
! Pos.
! Pl.
! W
! D
! L
! GS
! GA
! P
!Cup
!colspan=2|Europe
!Top scorer (league)
!Head coach
|-
|align=center|1992
| style="text-align:center;" rowspan="30"|1st
|align=center|4
|align=center|26
|align=center|13
|align=center|7
|align=center|6
|align=center|34
|align=center|25
|align=center|33
|align=center|—
| style="text-align:center;" colspan="2"|—
|align=left| Mukhamadiev – 7
|align=left| Semin
|-
|align=center|1993
|align=center|5
|align=center|34
|align=center|14
|align=center|11
|align=center|9
|align=center|45
|align=center|29
|align=center|39
|align=center|R16
| style="text-align:center;" colspan="2"|—
|align=left| Al. Smirnov – 9
|align=left| Semin
|-
|align=center|1994
|  style="text-align:center; background:#deb678;"|3
|align=center|30
|align=center|12
|align=center|12
|align=center|6
|align=center|49
|align=center|28
|align=center|36
|align=center|QF
|align=center|UC
|align=center|Round of 64
|align=left| Garin – 20
|align=left| Semin
|-
|align=center|1995
|  style="text-align:center; background:silver;"|2
|align=center|30
|align=center|20
|align=center|5
|align=center|5
|align=center|52
|align=center|23
|align=center|55
|align=center|QF
| style="text-align:center;" colspan="2"|—
|align=left| Garin – 13
|align=left| Semin
|-
|align=center|1996
|align=center|6
|align=center|34
|align=center|15
|align=center|10
|align=center|9
|align=center|46
|align=center|31
|align=center|55
|  style="text-align:center; background:gold;"|W
|align=center|UC
|align=center|Round of 64
|align=left| Kosolapov – 10
|align=left| Semin
|-
|align=center|1997
|align=center|5
|align=center|34
|align=center|15
|align=center|9
|align=center|10
|align=center|47
|align=center|37
|align=center|54
|  style="text-align:center; background:gold;"|W
|align=center|CWC
|align=center|Round of 16
|align=left| Kosolapov – 9
|align=left| Semin
|-
|align=center|1998
|  style="text-align:center; background:#deb678;"|3
|align=center|30
|align=center|16
|align=center|7
|align=center|7
|align=center|45
|align=center|28
|align=center|55
|  style="text-align:center; background:silver;"|RU
|align=center|CWC
|  style="text-align:center; background:bronze;"|Semi-final
|align=left| Borodyuk – 8 Janashiya – 9
|align=left| Semin
|-
|align=center|1999
|  style="text-align:center; background:silver;"|2
|align=center|30
|align=center|20
|align=center|5
|align=center|5
|align=center|62
|align=center|30
|align=center|65
|align=center|R32
|align=center|CWC
|  style="text-align:center; background:bronze;"|Semi-final
|align=left| Loskov – 14
|align=left| Semin
|-
|align=center|2000
|  style="text-align:center; background:silver;"|2
|align=center|30
|align=center|18
|align=center|8
|align=center|4
|align=center|50
|align=center|20
|align=center|62
|  style="text-align:center; background:gold;"|W
|align=center|UC
|align=center|Round of 64
|align=left| Loskov – 15
|align=left| Semin
|-
|align=center|2001
|  style="text-align:center; background:silver;"|2
|align=center|30
|align=center|16
|align=center|8
|align=center|6
|align=center|53
|align=center|24
|align=center|56
|  style="text-align:center; background:gold;"|W
|align=center|UC
|align=center|Round of 32
|align=left| Obiorah – 14
|align=left| Semin
|-
|align=center|2002
|  style="text-align:center; background:gold;"|1
|align=center|31
|align=center|20
|align=center|9
|align=center|2
|align=center|47
|align=center|14
|align=center|69
|align=center|R32
|align=center|UCLUC
|align=center|First group stageRound of 32
|align=left| Loskov – 7 Evseev – 7 Pimenov – 7
|align=left| Semin
|-
|align=center|2003
|align=center|4
|align=center|30
|align=center|15
|align=center|7
|align=center|8
|align=center|54
|align=center|33
|align=center|52
|align=center|R16
|align=center|UCL
|align=center|Second group stage
|align=left| Loskov – 14
|align=left| Semin
|-
|align=center|2004
|  style="text-align:center; background:gold;"|1
|align=center|30
|align=center|18
|align=center|7
|align=center|5
|align=center|44
|align=center|19
|align=center|61
|align=center|QF
|align=center|UCL
|align=center|Round of 16
|align=left| Sychev – 15
|align=left| Semin
|-
|align=center|2005
|  style="text-align:center; background:#deb678;"|3
|align=center|30
|align=center|14
|align=center|14
|align=center|2
|align=center|41
|align=center|18
|align=center|56
|align=center|R32
| style="text-align:center;" colspan="2"|—
|align=left| Bilyaletdinov – 8
|align=left| Semin Eshtrekov
|-
|align=center|2006
|  style="text-align:center; background:#deb678;"|3
|align=center|30
|align=center|15
|align=center|8
|align=center|7
|align=center|47
|align=center|34
|align=center|53
|align=center|QF
|align=center|UCLUC
|align=center|Third qualifying roundRound of 32
|align=left| Loskov – 13
|align=left| Muslin Dolmatov
|-
|align=center|2007
|align=center|7
|align=center|30
|align=center|11
|align=center|8
|align=center|11
|align=center|39
|align=center|42
|align=center|41
|  style="text-align:center; background:gold;"|W
|align=center|UC
|align=center|First round
|align=left| Sychev – 11
|align=left| Byshovets
|-
|align=center|2008
|align=center|7
|align=center|30
|align=center|13
|align=center|8
|align=center|9
|align=center|37
|align=center|32
|align=center|47
|align=center|R32
|align=center|UC
|align=center|Group stage
|align=left| Odemwingie – 10
|align=left| Rakhimov
|-
|align=center|2009
|align=center|4
|align=center|30
|align=center|15
|align=center|9
|align=center|6
|align=center|43
|align=center|30
|align=center|54
|align=center|R32
| style="text-align:center;" colspan="2"|—
|align=left| Sychev – 12
|align=left| Rakhimov Maminov Semin
|-
|align=center|2010
|align=center|5
|align=center|30
|align=center|13
|align=center|9
|align=center|8
|align=center|34
|align=center|29
|align=center|48
|align=center|R32
|align=center|EL
|align=center|Play-off Round
|align=left| Aliyev – 14
|align=left| Semin
|-
|align=center|2011–12
|align=center|7
|align=center|44
|align=center|18
|align=center|12
|align=center|14
|align=center|59
|align=center|48
|align=center|66
|align=center|QF
|align=center|EL
|align=center|Round of 32
|align=left| Glushakov – 11
|align=left| Krasnozhan Maminov Couceiro
|-
|align=center|2012–13
|align=center|9
|align=center|30
|align=center|12
|align=center|7
|align=center|11
|align=center|39
|align=center|36
|align=center|43
|align=center|R16
| style="text-align:center;" colspan="2"|—
|align=left| N'Doye – 10
|align=left| Bilić
|-
|align=center|2013–14
|  style="text-align:center; background:#deb678;"|3
|align=center|30
|align=center|17
|align=center|8
|align=center|5
|align=center|51
|align=center|23
|align=center|59
|align=center|R32
| style="text-align:center;" colspan="2"|—
|align=left| N'Doye – 13
|align=left| Kuchuk
|-
|align=center|2014–15
|align=center|7
|align=center|30
|align=center|11
|align=center|10
|align=center|9
|align=center|31
|align=center|25
|align=center|43
|  style="text-align:center; background:gold;"|W
|align=center|EL
|align=center|Play-off Round
|align=left| Fernandes – 7
|align=left| Kuchuk Cherevchenko Božović Cherevchenko
|-
|align=center|2015–16
|align=center|6
|align=center|30
|align=center|14
|align=center|8
|align=center|8
|align=center|43
|align=center|33
|align=center|50
|align=center|R16
|align=center|EL
|align=center|Round of 32
|align=left| Samedov – 9
|align=left| Cherevchenko
|-
|align=center|2016–17
|align=center|8
|align=center|30
|align=center|10
|align=center|12
|align=center|8
|align=center|39
|align=center|27
|align=center|42
|  style="text-align:center; background:gold;"|W
| style="text-align:center;" colspan="2"|—
|align=left| Fernandes – 9
|align=left| Cherevchenko Pashinin Semin
|-
|align=center|2017–18
|  style="text-align:center; background:gold;"|1
|align=center|30
|align=center|18
|align=center|6
|align=center|6
|align=center|41
|align=center|21
|align=center|60
|align=center|R32
|align=center|EL
|align=center|Round of 16
|align=left| Farfán – 10
|align=left| Semin
|-
|align=center|2018–19
|  style="text-align:center; background:silver;"|2
|align=center|30
|align=center|16
|align=center|8
|align=center|6
|align=center|45
|align=center|28
|align=center|56
|  style="text-align:center; background:gold;"|W
|align=center|UCL
|align=center|Group Stage
|align=left| An. Miranchuk – 11
|align=left| Semin
|-
|align=center|2019–20
|  style="text-align:center; background:silver;"|2
|align=center|30
|align=center|16
|align=center|9
|align=center|5
|align=center|41
|align=center|29
|align=center|57
|align=center|R32
|align=center|UCL
|align=center|Group Stage
|align=left| Al. Miranchuk – 12
|align=left| Semin Nikolić
|-
|align=center|2020–21
|  style="text-align:center; background:#deb678;"|3
|align=center|30
|align=center|17
|align=center|5
|align=center|8
|align=center|45
|align=center|35
|align=center|56
|  style="text-align:center; background:gold;"|W
|align=center|UCL
|align=center|Group Stage
|align=left| Krychowiak – 9
|align=left| Nikolić
|-
|align=center|2021–22
|align=center|6
|align=center|30
|align=center|13
|align=center|9
|align=center|8
|align=center|43
|align=center|39
|align=center|48
|align:center|R16
|align=center|EL
|align=center|Group Stage
|align=left| Zhemaletdinov – 9
|align=left| Nikolić Gisdol Loskov Khapov
|-
|}

Notable players
Had international caps for their respective countries. Players whose name is listed in bold represented their countries while playing for Lokomotiv.

USSR/Russia

  German Apukhtin
  Valentin Bubukin
  Stanislav Cherchesov
  Yuri Chesnokov
  Yuri Gavrilov
  Valery Gazzaev
  Sergei Gorlukovich
  Georgi Kondratyev
  Vladimir Maslachenko
  Valeri Novikov
  Valery Petrakov
  Anatoli Porkhunov
  Viktor Shishkin
  Viktor Voroshilov
  Georgi Yartsev
  Dmitri Alenichev
  Ari
  Aleksei Arifullin
  Dmitri Barinov
  Maksim Belyayev
  Diniyar Bilyaletdinov
  Aleksandr Borodyuk
  Aleksei Bugayev
  Dmitri Bulykin
  Taras Burlak
  Maksim Buznikin
  Igor Chugainov
  Igor Denisov
  Yuri Drozdov
  Artem Dzyuba
  Vadim Evseev
  Denis Glushakov
  Maksim Glushenkov
  Maksim Grigoryev
  Guilherme
  Sergei Ignashevich
  Vladislav Ignatyev
  Marat Izmailov
  Zaur Khapov
  Yevgeni Kharlachyov
  Dmitri Khokhlov
  Aleksei Kosolapov
  Oleg Kuzmin
  Arseny Logashov
  Dmitri Loskov
  Aleksei Miranchuk
  Anton Miranchuk
   Mukhsin Mukhamadiev
  Maksim Mukhin
  Gennadiy Nizhegorodov
  Ruslan Nigmatullin
  Sergei Ovchinnikov
  Magomed Ozdoyev
  Roman Pavlyuchenko
  Ruslan Pimenov
  Sergei Pinyayev
  Sergei Podpaly
  Aleksandr Podshivalov
  Dmitry Poloz
  Igor Portnyagin
   Rashid Rakhimov
  Sergei Ryzhikov
  Aleksandr Samedov

  Dmitri Sennikov
  Oleg Sergeyev
  Aleksandr Sheshukov
  Roman Shishkin
  Aleksandr Silyanov
  Alexei Smertin
  Igor Smolnikov
  Fyodor Smolov
  Andrei Solomatin
  Dmitri Sychev
  Dmitri Tarasov
  Bakhva Tedeyev
  Oleg Teryokhin
  Dmitri Torbinski
   Ilya Tsymbalar
  Renat Yanbayev
  Andrey Yeshchenko
  Rifat Zhemaletdinov

Former USSR countries
  Hovhannes Goharyan
  Sargis Hovhannisyan
  Arshak Koryan
  Artur Sarkisov
  Albert Sarkisyan
  Narvik Sirkhayev
  Anton Amelchanka
  Syarhey Amelyanchuk
  Syarhei Hurenka
  Ihar Hurynovich
  Andrei Lavrik
  Vitaly Lisakovich
  Mikalay Ryndzyuk
  Yan Tsiharow
  Dmitri Kruglov
  Malkhaz Asatiani
  Mikheil Ashvetia
  Giorgi Chelidze
  Giorgi Demetradze
  Zaza Janashia
  Khvicha Kvaratskhelia
  Solomon Kvirkvelia
  Davit Mujiri
  Evgeniy Lovchev
  Valeriy Yablochkin
  Mirlan Murzaev
  Deividas Česnauskis
  Robertas Fridrikas
  Valdas Ivanauskas
  Arvydas Janonis
  Romas Mažeikis
  Vyacheslav Sukristov
  Stanislav Ivanov
  Yuri Baturenko
  Igor Cherevchenko
  Khakim Fuzailov
  Vitaliy Parakhnevych
  Vasili Postnov
  Oleksandr Aliyev
  Taras Mykhalyk
  Vitaliy Denisov
  Jasurbek Jaloliddinov
  Vladimir Maminov
  Oleg Pashinin
  Aleksey Polyakov

Europe
  Mario Mitaj
  Senijad Ibričić
  Emir Spahić
  Vedran Ćorluka
  Tomislav Dujmović
  Tin Jedvaj
  Dario Krešić
  Marek Čech
  Jan Kuchta
  Boris Rotenberg
  Lassana Diarra
  Benedikt Höwedes
  Ivan Pelizzoli
  Marko Baša
  Luka Đorđević
  Marko Rakonjac
  Grzegorz Krychowiak
  Maciej Rybus
  Eder
  João Mário
  Manuel Fernandes
  Răzvan Cociş
  Garry O'Connor
  Milan Jovanović
  Nemanja Pejčinović
  Slobodan Rajković
  Petar Škuletić
   Branislav Ivanović
  Milan Obradović
  Ján Ďurica
  Marián Had
  Branko Ilić
  Eldin Jakupović
  Reto Ziegler

South and Central America
  Pablo
  Winston Parks
  Felipe Caicedo
  Jefferson Farfán

Africa
  André Bikey
  Zé Luís
  Delvin N'Dinga
  Baba Adamu
  Haminu Draman
  Laryea Kingston
  François Kamano
  Essau Kanyenda
  Dramane Traoré
  Mbark Boussoufa
  Manuel da Costa
  Brian Idowu
  Sani Kaita
  Victor Obinna
  James Obiorah
  Peter Odemwingie
  Baye Djiby Fall
  Dame N'Doye
  Oumar Niasse
  Jacob Lekgetho
  Bennett Mnguni
  Chaker Zouaghi

Club records

Coaching staff

See also

 FC Lokomotiv Moscow in Europe
 FC Kazanka Moscow
 WFC Lokomotiv Moscow
 RC Lokomotiv Moscow

References

External links

 Official site
 Official site
  Fans' Organization "UnitedSouth"
  Italian Blog

 
Association football clubs established in 1922
Football clubs in Moscow
1922 establishments in Russia
Moscow
FC
Soviet Top League clubs